Oakley railway station was built by the Midland Railway in 1857 on its extension from Leicester to Bedford and Hitchin.

It was closed to passengers in 1958 and closed completely in 1963. The station buildings remain in a dilapidated state though the goods yard is used by a haulage company.

About a mile (2 km) north of the station is the point where the Midland installed its first troughs to allow locomotives to pick up water. The line is elevated because of problems with flooding. Even the local roads have raised walkways.

Croxhall opened in 1840 by the Birmingham and Derby Junction Railway was previously known as Oakley but was renamed on 1 December previously.

Route

References

Disused railway stations in Bedfordshire
Former Midland Railway stations
Railway stations in Great Britain opened in 1857
Railway stations in Great Britain closed in 1958
Charles Henry Driver railway stations
1857 establishments in England